The Nogales-Mariposa Arizona Port of Entry opened in 1973 to divert truck traffic away from the busy downtown Grand Avenue border crossing.  It connects Arizona State Route 189 directly with Mexican Federal Highway 15D. All commercial traffic entering the United States at Nogales now enters through the Mariposa port of entry.  The port facilities underwent a nearly $250 million  renovation project between 2009 and 2014 to accommodate increasing traffic and to support new equipment and procedures. Renovation of roadways leading to the Mariposa Entry to reduce wait times for vehicles was begun in 2020 by the Arizona Department of Transportation, with expected completion in late 2021.

See also

 List of Mexico–United States border crossings
 List of Canada–United States border crossings

References

Mexico–United States border crossings
1973 establishments in Arizona
Buildings and structures in Santa Cruz County, Arizona